Francis Moore is the name of:

Francis Moore (astrologer) (1657–1715), English physician, astrologer, and publisher of Old Moore's Almanack
Sir Francis Moore (barrister) (1558–1621), English barrister and Under Steward of Oxford University
Francis Moore (geographer) (bap. 1708, d. in or after 1756), British travel writer
Francis Moore (ice hockey) (1900–1976), Canadian ice hockey player and Olympic silver medalist
Francis Moore (Medal of Honor) (1858–?), American sailor and Medal of Honor recipient
Francis Daniels Moore (1913–2001), American surgeon
Francis W. Moore Jr. (1808–1864), second mayor of Houston, Texas
Francis Moore (cricketer) (1827–1900), English cricketer

See also
Francis More (by 1525–1575), MP
Frank Moore (disambiguation)